Greenwood School District or the Greenwood Public School District may refer to:

 Greenwood School District (Arkansas)
 Greenwood Public School District (Mississippi)
 Greenwood School District (Pennsylvania)